Alexander True (born July 17, 1997) is a Danish professional ice hockey centre currently playing for the Coachella Valley Firebirds in the American Hockey League (AHL) while under contract to the Seattle Kraken in the National Hockey League (NHL).

Playing career
True played major junior hockey with the Seattle Thunderbirds in the Western Hockey League (WHL) and was signed as an undrafted free agent by the San Jose Sharks on July 18, 2018.

During the  season, True made his NHL debut on February 4, 2020, in a 3–1 win over the Calgary Flames. His recorded his first point two days later, during a 6–3 win against the Edmonton Oilers.

On July 21, 2021, True was selected from the Sharks at the 2021 NHL Expansion Draft by the Seattle Kraken.

Personal life 
Winnipeg Jets left wing Nikolaj Ehlers is True's cousin.

Career statistics

Regular season and playoffs

International

References

External links

1997 births
Living people
Charlotte Checkers (2010–) players
Coachella Valley Firebirds players
Danish expatriate ice hockey people
Danish expatriate sportspeople in the United States
Danish ice hockey centres
Expatriate ice hockey players in the United States
Rungsted Seier Capital players
San Jose Barracuda players
San Jose Sharks players
Seattle Kraken players
Seattle Thunderbirds players
Sportspeople from Copenhagen
Undrafted National Hockey League players